blued is the Bluetooth daemon in macOS (previously Mac OS X). It is started by the system and is not interacted with directly by the user. The daemon handles service discovery, link key management and incoming connection acceptance.

See also
 Bluetooth File Exchange

MacOS
Bluetooth software